Cytomelanconis is a genus of fungi within the Melanconidaceae family. This is a monotypic genus, containing the single species Cytomelanconis systema-solare.

References

External links
Cytomelanconis at Index Fungorum

Melanconidaceae
Monotypic Sordariomycetes genera